Taboo is a fruit-flavoured spirit made in the UK. Its main ingredients are vodka, white wine and peach and tropical fruit juices. Its alcohol content is 14.9% (29.8 proof).

Taboo was first put out on the market in 1988 by drinks company First Drink. However after a honeymoon period for the product up until the early 1990s the company spent very little money on promoting it in later years; in 2005 only £8,000 was spent. In 2006 First Drink hired 23red to boost Taboo's profile.

Originally the drink was marketed with a companion spirit called Mirage, with advertising showing both products.

References

Alcopops
Premixed alcoholic drinks